Kashubian can refer to:

 Pertaining to Kashubia, a region of north-central Poland
 Kashubians, an ethnic group of north-central Poland
 Kashubian language

See also
Kashubian alphabet
Kashubian Landscape Park
Kashubian studies

Language and nationality disambiguation pages